HC Panter is an ice hockey team located in Tallinn, Estonia, and playing in the Coolbet Hokiliiga, the top tier of ice hockey in Estonia. They play home games at the Škoda Ice Arena in the Haabersti district.

History
HC Panter were founded in 2001 by Rein Mölder and Olle Sildre, and participated in the following years Meistriliiga. A few years later in 2004, the team won their first, and as of January 2021 only, Meistriliiga title, beating PSK Narva in the play-off final. For the 2005-06 season, HC Panter also participated in the 2. Divisioona, the Finnish forth tier, ultimately finishing in 4th place in the Uusimaa conference. Following their time in Finland, the team were inactive between 2006 - 2011. They returned to Meistriliiga in 2011 as HC Panter/Purikad after a merger with Tallinn-based junior team HC Purikad. The team ultimately reverted to the HC Panter moniker in 2015. HC Panter were again inactive in the Meistriliiga from 2016-2020, instead focusing solely on youth development. The team would again return to top flight for the 2020-21 season.

Roster 
Updated January 18, 2021.

Season-by-season record
This is a list of seasons completed by the HC Panter.

Note: GP = Games played, W = Wins, OTW = Overtime wins, T = Ties, OTL = Overtime losses, L = Losses, Pts = Points, GF = Goals for, GA = Goals against

Honours
Meistriliiga Championships: 
 2004

Notable players
 Robert Rooba began his career at HC Purikad.

References

External links
 
eestihoki.ee 

Sport in Tallinn
Ice hockey teams in Estonia
Meistriliiga (ice hockey)
Ice hockey clubs established in 2001
2011 establishments in Estonia